Thérèse Philosophe (Therese the Philosopher) is a 1748 French novel ascribed to Jean-Baptiste de Boyer, Marquis d'Argens. It has been chiefly regarded as a pornographic novel, which accounts for its massive sales in 18th-century France. The novel represents a public conveyance (and arguably perversion) for some ideas of the Philosophes.

Summary

The narrative starts with Therese, sexually precocious in spite of herself, from solid bourgeois stock, being placed by her mother in a convent when she is 11 years old. There she eventually becomes sick because her pleasure principle is not permitted to express itself, putting her body into disorder, and bringing her close to the grave until her mother finally yanks her out of the convent at age 23.

She then becomes a student of Father Dirrag, a Jesuit who secretly teaches materialism. Therese spies on Dirrag counseling her fellow student, Mlle. Eradice, and preying on her spiritual ambition in order to seduce her. Through flagellation and penetration, Dirrag gives Mlle. Eradice what she thinks is spiritual ecstasy but is actually sexual. "Father Dirrag" and "Mlle. Eradice" are named after anagrams of Jean-Baptiste Girard and Catherine Cadière, who were involved in a highly publicized trial for the illicit relationship between priest and student in 1730.

After that she spends time with Mme. C and the Abbé T., and spies on them on multiple occasions, while they discuss libertine political and religious philosophy just before they engage in, and sometimes during, various acts of sex. (Abbé T. is clearly the same character as figures in another, eponymous, coming-of-age, soft-core libertine novel published that same year or possibly one year earlier: Ecclesiastical Laurels, or Abbot T.'s Campaigns with the Triumph of the Nuns, attributed to Jacques Rochette La Morlière; this latter novel is one of several titles listed towards the end of Therese the Philosopher as belonging to the library owned by the count, which library he loans to Therese as part of a bet.)

Therese's sexual education continues with her relationship with Mme. Bois-Laurier, an experienced prostitute, who is also a virgin much to her clients' surprise, delight and also disappointment. Many a John will try to break through her maidenhead, without success. This section of the novel constitutes an arguably hilarious variation on the whore dialogues that were common in early pornographic novels.

Finally, Therese meets the unnamed Count who wants her for his mistress. She refuses him intercourse, out of her fear of death in childbirth (not unreasonable at the time) and also because she finds masturbation to be sufficiently pleasurable in and of itself. He makes a bet with her. If she can last two weeks in a room full of erotic books and paintings without masturbating, he will not demand intercourse with her. Therese loses and becomes the Count's permanent mistress.

Philosophical and social concepts
For all of its printed debauchery, the work has some philosophical merit in its underlying concepts. Between the more graphically adult sections of the novel, philosophical issues would be discussed amongst the characters, including materialism, hedonism and atheism. All phenomena are matter in motion, and religion is a fraud, though useful for keeping the working classes in line.

The book not only draws attention to the sexual repression of women at the time of the enlightenment, but also to the exploitation of religious authority through salacious acts.

Influence and adaptations
Dostoevsky referred repeatedly to the novel in his working notes for both The Idiot and The Possessed.
Thérése Philosophe was loosely adapted as the second segment of Walerian Borowczyk's French anthology film Immoral Tales (1973). Therese was played by Charlotte Alexandra.

References

Sources 
 Darnton, Robert. The Forbidden Best-sellers of Pre-revolutionary France W. W. Norton & Company, 1996 
 Brumfield, William C. "Thérèse philosophe and Dostoevsky's Great Sinner," Comparative Literature, vol. 32 (summer 1980) 3:238-52.

Further reading 
 William C. Brumfield, « Thérèse philosophe and Dostoevsky's Great Sinner », Comparative Literature, Summer 1980, n° 32 (3), p. 238-52
 Jacqueline Chammas, « Le Clergé et l’inceste spirituel dans trois romans du XVIIIe siècle : Le Portier des Chartreux, Thérèse philosophe et Margot la ravaudeuse », Eighteenth-Century Fiction, Apr-July 2003, n° 15 (3-4), p. 687-704
 Catherine Cusset, « 'L’Exemple et le raisonnement': Désir et raison dans Thérèse philosophe (1748) », Nottingham French Studies, Spring 1998, n° 37 (1), p. 1-15
 Gudrun Gersmann, « Das Geschäft mit der Lust des Lesers: Thérèse philosophe-zur Druckgeschichte eines erotischen Bestsellers im 18. Jahrhundert », Das Achtzehnte Jahrhundert, 1994, n° 18 (1), p. 72-84
 .
 Jean Mainil, « Jamais fille chaste n’a lu de romans : lecture en cachette, lecture en abyme dans Thérèse philosophe », Éd. Jan Herman, Paul Pelckmans, L’Épreuve du lecteur : Livres et lectures dans le roman d’Ancien Régime, Paris, Peeters; 1995, p. 308-16
 Natania Meeker, « 'I Resist no Longer': Enlightened Philosophy and Feminine Compulsion in Thérèse philosophe », Eighteenth-Century Studies, Spring 2006, n° 39 (3), p. 363-76
 Nicolas Miteran, « La Fureur poétique des abbés ou les illusions dangereuses : les Discours édifiants dans Thérèse philosophe (1748) », Éd. Et intro. Jacques Wagner, Roman et Religion en France (1713-1866), Paris, Champion, 2002, p. 83-97
 Anne Richardot, « Thérèse philosophe : Les Charmes de l'impénétrable », Eighteenth-Century Life, May 1997, n° 21 (2), p. 89-99
 Jeanne-Hélène Roy, « S(t)imulating Pleasure: The Female Body in Sade's Les Infortunes de la Vertu and Thérèse philosophe », Cincinnati Romance Review, 1999, n° 18, p. 122-31
 Hans-Ulrich Seifert, «Der Heilige Strick [Postface]», Thérèse philosophe, ed. Michael Farin et Hans-Ulrich Seifert,  Munich 1990, p. 423-446

External links

 A Narrative of the case of Mrs. Mary Katharine Cadiere, against Father John Baptist Girard

 Complete text in French

1748 novels
18th-century French novels
French erotic novels
French philosophical novels
French novels adapted into films
Pornographic novels
Works published anonymously
Works about sexual repression